Nanda Kishore Prusty (1919 – 7 December 2021) was an Indian teacher from Kantira, Odisha. In 2021, he was awarded the Padma Shri for his contribution to education.

Prusty died of COVID-19 on 7 December 2021, aged 102.

References

1919 births
2021 deaths
Educators from Odisha
20th-century Indian educators
21st-century Indian educators
Recipients of the Padma Shri in literature & education
Indian centenarians
Men centenarians
People from Jaipur district
Deaths from the COVID-19 pandemic in India